L'Officiel Hommes is a French luxury fashion and lifestyle magazine for men, adapted from L'Officiel, owned by a French media group "Les Éditions Jalou". It has been published in Paris since 2005 and targets men interested in fashion.

History

L'Officiel Hommes was introduced in 2005 under publications of "Les Éditions Jalou" after the great success of L'Officiel, first published in 1921. Les Editions Jalou has many international versions of L'Officiel and L'Officiel Hommes. L'Officiel Hommes is published in several countries, including China, Germany, Italy, Turkey, Korea, Lebanon, Morocco, Poland, Thailand, The Netherlands, Ukraine and Spain.

In January 2005, Editions Jalou launched L'Officiel Hommes, the first magazine to be created by a stylist and not by a journalist. Marie-José Susskind-Jalou asked one of the founders of the Colette boutique in Paris, Milan Vukmirovic, to make a bi-annual magazine dedicated 100% to fashion that treats the trends of the season and presents a luxurious showcase for men's fashion. Milan Vukmirovic, who helped launch the mother of all concept stores, Colette, in 1997 and took the reins from Jil Sander when she left her label in the early 2000s also the creative director of Trussardi, has added another dimension to fashion.

On 12 May 2011 in Paris, L’Officiel Hommes, the quarterly French men’s fashion magazine, named André Saraiva, the graffiti artist and nightclub entrepreneur, as its new creative director. André Saraiva succeeds  Milan Vukmirovic, designer and photographer, who had led the title for the past five years.

In 2015, L’Officiel Hommes introduced Pablo Arroyo, a photographer, as the new creative director for the magazine. The role of the Editor-in-Chief was given to Baptiste Piégay. In September 2015, Arroyo introduced a new logo, layout, tone, and website for the title.

Famous supermodels like Andres Velencoso Segura, Baptiste Giabiconi and Jesus Luz have graced the covers of the magazine.

Controversy
Andre Saraiva tagged and defaced National Park property in 2015:

"As the best-known artist who has tagged in a national park, Saraiva has become a favorite target ever since his signature "OX" mark, revered when it adorns man-made structures, popped up on a boulder the size of a large dog kennel at Joshua Tree. He cofounded his error by denying that the boulder was in the park. Answering critics, he posted on Instagram saying his work was "made with love at friends privet back yard and not your national park! [sic]."

Readers then used Google satellite maps, latitude and longitude coordinates and their own field notes to pinpoint the boulder's exact location — inside the park. Facing a torrent of criticism, Saraiva had scrawled, his lawyer acknowledged, what he described as an "insignificant" artistic expression on the rock, using water-based paint that was erased a few days later. The attorney also demanded that Modern Hiker take down its article, saying it made Saraiva the target of "oppressive and unjustified messages that seriously harm his professional and private life."

Modern Hiker's lawyers replied that defacing a national park is prohibited under federal law and may be punishable by a fine and imprisonment. The article remained on the website. On 1 April, Saraiva paid a fine of $275 to the U.S. District Court in Los Angeles, officials said. He could not be reached for comment."

Under the direction of André Saraiva, in winter 2012, Benicio Del Toro appears on the winter cover of L'Officiel Hommes, looking dapper in his trademark suit and smoldering stare while carrying the stark naked and unconscious woman. The André Saraiva-shot cover is unarguably a bit disturbing. As Styleite notes, "What exactly is supposed to have happened right before the shot was taken? Is she a damsel in distress that was just saved by del Toro (because that would have some pretty sexist undertones), or is it something more sinister?"

Again in summer 2013, Kanye West and Kim Kardashian appears nude on the summer cover. L'Officiel Homme commissioned Nick Knight from SHOWstudio to shoot a classic story of the duo for their launch during Paris Fashion Week.

References

https://lofficielpolska.bigcartel.com/product/l-officiel-hommes-polska-nr-10-2020-2021
Model Josh McGregor stars on the cover of L'Officiel Hommes Poland December issue

External links
 Archive of the magazine (in French)

2005 establishments in France
Men's magazines published in France
French-language magazines
Magazines established in 2005
Magazines published in Paris
Men's fashion magazines
Quarterly magazines published in France